The East Arnhem land gehyra (Gehyra arnhemica) is a species of gecko. It is endemic to Northern Territory in Australia.  The species was first described in 2020.

References

arnhemica
Geckos of Australia
Endemic fauna of Australia
Reptiles described in 2020
Taxa named by Paul M. Oliver
Taxa named by Leonardo G. Tedeschi
Taxa named by Ryan J. Ellis
Taxa named by Paul Doughty
Taxa named by Craig Moritz